20 Years of Weird: Flaming Lips 1986–2006 is an updated version of the free compilation CD given away at the SXSW Film premier of The Flaming Lips documentary "The Fearless Freaks", a film by Bradley Beesley. It is a predominantly live compilation, recorded throughout the career of the Flaming Lips (between 1986 and 2003), though the first three tracks are recorded in the studio. These are: the introduction by Wayne Coyne, "Free Radicals" from the current album At War with the Mystics and "Enthusiasm for Life Defeats Existential Fear", a previously unavailable track.

Some notable tracks contained on this compilation are "Shine on Sweet Jesus", a track recorded live with a short lived line-up which included Jonathan Donahue (of Mercury Rev), and current Flaming Lips producer Dave Fridmann, also of Mercury Rev. There is also a cover of Led Zeppelin's "Whole Lotta Love" (sung with the lyrics "Whole Lotta Satan"), which is played before "Cant Stop the Spring". The track "Sleeping on the Roof" is a live recording from the Flaming Lips' "Parking Lot Experiments" in 1996, where the band got some of their fans to play pre-recorded tapes (of music by the band) in their car stereos simultaneously.

Track listing

 = Not mentioned on CD track list.

See also
 2006 in music

References

The Flaming Lips compilation albums
2006 compilation albums
Warner Records compilation albums